Karl-Anthony Towns Jr. (born November 15, 1995), sometimes known as KAT (his initials), is a Dominican-American professional basketball player for the Minnesota Timberwolves of the National Basketball Association (NBA). He played college basketball for the Kentucky Wildcats. Towns was named to the Dominican Republic national team as a 16-year-old. He was selected with the first overall pick in the 2015 NBA draft by the Minnesota Timberwolves, and went on to be named NBA Rookie of the Year for the 2015–16 season. He has received three All-Star selections. Towns also won the 2021–22 NBA Three-Point Contest.

Early life
Towns was born in Edison, New Jersey to an African-American father, Karl Towns Sr., and a Dominican mother, Jacqueline Cruz. He grew up in Piscataway, New Jersey, and attended Lake Nelson Seventh-Day Adventist School, before transferring to Theodore Schor Middle School from Our Lady of Fatima School in 2009. At Theodore Schor, he reclassified and repeated seventh grade in order to gain an extra year of development. Towns's father played basketball for Monmouth University and coached basketball at Piscataway Technical High School, where the precocious Towns practiced with the junior varsity team as a fifth grader.

High school career

As a freshman at St. Joseph High School, Towns led the basketball team to a state championship in 2012, earning himself the top position in the ESPN 25 national ranking of high school players. Towns also led his team to state titles in 2013 and 2014. Towns was selected at the age of 16 to play on the Dominican Republic national basketball team, which represents that nation in international competition. Towns was eligible based on the fact that his mother is from the Dominican Republic. During 2011 and 2012 competitions, John Calipari, head coach at the University of Kentucky and a former NBA head coach, coached the team, which finished third in the 2011 FIBA Americas Championship and fourth place at the 2012 FIBA World Olympic Qualifying Tournament for Men, falling one position short of qualifying for the 2012 Olympic Basketball Tournament.

In December 2012, Towns announced that he was going to reclassify as a senior and commit to play on the Kentucky Wildcats men's basketball team under Coach John Calipari, who had coached him as part of the national team of the Dominican Republic. ESPN, which had ranked him as the top prospect in the 2015 recruiting class, listed him as third-ranked in its 2014 class. Towns graduated from high school with a 3.96 GPA on a 4.5 scale. He was named the 2014 Gatorade Player of the Year.

On January 6, 2013, Towns recorded a quadruple-double with 16 points, 17 rebounds, 11 blocks and 11 assists. He recorded a second quadruple-double on January 5, 2014 with 20 points, 14 rebounds, 12 blocks and 10 assists. Towns averaged 20.9 points, 13.4 rebounds and 6.2 blocks per game as a senior.

College career

In his freshman year, Kentucky used a unique "platoon system" that limited the minutes of each player, and he subsequently averaged 10.3 points and 6.7 rebounds in 21.1 minutes per game. He studied kinesiology in his one year at Kentucky, and hopes to become a doctor after his basketball career. Though he left Kentucky for the NBA, Towns enrolled in online courses, and hopes to earn his degree. He was named a second-team All-American by the Associated Press and NABC, and a third-team All-American by Sporting News. Throughout the 2014–15 season, Towns was often ranked behind Duke center Jahlil Okafor as a draft prospect. However, due to strong play in the NCAA Tournament, and a growing consensus that Towns was a better defensive player and had an opportunity to become a better offensive player as well, Towns overtook Okafor in most draft rankings.

On April 9, 2015, Towns and fellow Kentucky teammates Andrew Harrison, Aaron Harrison, Dakari Johnson, Devin Booker, Trey Lyles and Willie Cauley-Stein, all declared for the 2015 NBA draft.

Professional career

Minnesota Timberwolves (2015–present)

Rookie of the Year (2015–2016) 
On June 25, 2015, Towns was selected by the Minnesota Timberwolves with the first overall pick in the 2015 NBA draft. He signed his rookie scale contract with the Timberwolves on July 7, and made his NBA debut in the Timberwolves' season opener against the Los Angeles Lakers on October 28, recording 14 points and 12 rebounds as a starter in a 112–111 win. In the following game on October 30 against the Denver Nuggets, his 28 points and 14 rebounds propelled the Timberwolves to their first 2–0 start with two wins on the road in team history. Over his first 13 games of the season, Towns averaged 16.0 points and 10.4 rebounds per game. Those numbers dropped, however, to 8.4 points and 6.0 rebounds over the next five games. Despite this, on December 3, he was named Western Conference Rookie of the Month for November, becoming just the seventh Timberwolves player to win NBA Rookie of the Month honors.

On January 20, 2016, Towns had a season-best game with 27 points and career highs of 17 rebounds and six blocks in a 106–94 loss to the Dallas Mavericks. On January 29, he recorded 32 points and 12 rebounds in a loss to the Utah Jazz, becoming the youngest player to have 30 points and 10 rebounds in a game since Kevin Durant did so in 2008. On February 2, he was named Western Conference Rookie of the Month for January—his third consecutive rookie of the month honor. On February 10, he scored a then career-high 35 points in a 117–112 win over the Toronto Raptors. Three days later, he won the 2016 NBA All-Star Weekend Skills Challenge over point guard Isaiah Thomas, becoming the tallest, heaviest, and youngest winner of the event. On March 3, named Western Conference Rookie of the Month for February, joining teammate Andrew Wiggins (November, December 2014, January, February 2015) as the second player in Wolves history to earn NBA Rookie of the Month honors in four consecutive months.

On March 25, Towns grabbed 10 rebounds against the Washington Wizards, setting a Minnesota rookie rebounding record, pushing his season total to 741 and passing Kevin Love's record of 734. On April 7, he recorded his 50th double-double of the season with 17 points and 10 rebounds in a 105–97 win over the Sacramento Kings. Four days later, in a loss to the Houston Rockets, Towns passed Christian Laettner for the franchise's rookie scoring record with 1,475 points. Earlier that day, he was named Western Conference Player of the Week for games played Monday, April 4 through Sunday, April 10. Towns played and started in all 82 games for the Timberwolves in 2015–16, averaging 18.3 points and 10.5 rebounds per game; he subsequently earned unanimous NBA Rookie of the Year honors. Towns earned Western Conference Rookie of the Month honors in each of the season's six months, becoming the first Timberwolves player to do so. In addition, he became just the fifth unanimous NBA Rookie of the Year, and with teammate Andrew Wiggins winning the award in 2014–15, Minnesota became the first team with back-to-back Rookie of the Year winners since the Buffalo Braves in 1972–73 (Bob McAdoo) and 1973–74 (Ernie DiGregorio), as well as the first team with back-to-back No. 1 draft picks earning Rookie of the Year honors. He also earned NBA All-Rookie First Team honors.

Improving as a sophomore (2016–2017) 
On November 30, 2016, Towns recorded a then career-high 47 points and 18 rebounds in a 106–104 loss to the New York Knicks. At 21 years old, Towns became the third-youngest player in the last three decades to have at least 45 points and 15 rebounds in a game. In addition, his 22 first-quarter points were two off of Chauncey Billups' franchise record of 24. With two blocks against the Charlotte Hornets on December 3, Towns established a new Timberwolves record with his 27th straight game with at least one blocked shot. On December 28, he recorded his first career triple-double with 15 points, 11 rebounds and 10 assists in a 105–103 loss to the Denver Nuggets. On March 8, 2017, he had 29 points and 14 rebounds in a 107–91 win over the Los Angeles Clippers. Towns had his 100th career double-double in the win, becoming the second-youngest player in league history to reach that mark, behind only Dwight Howard. Five days later, he was named Western Conference Player of the Week for games played Monday, March 6 through Sunday, March 12. On April 11, 2017, he had 26 points and 12 rebounds in a 100–98 loss to the Oklahoma City Thunder. Towns surpassed Kevin Love during the game to set a franchise record for points in a season. Towns made NBA history in 2016–17 by becoming the only player to have at least 2,000 points (2,061), 1,000 rebounds (1,007) and 100 3-pointers (101) in a season.

First All-Star and All-NBA appearances (2017–2018) 
On November 15, 2017, Towns had 26 points and 16 rebounds for Minnesota on the night he turned 22, helping the Timberwolves end a 12-game losing streak to the San Antonio Spurs with a 98–86 victory. Towns finished in the top 10 in almost every statistical category in NBA history compiled prior to the player's 22nd birthday. He ranked eighth in points, third in rebounds and second in double-doubles (124), trailing only Dwight Howard (169). Towns subsequently earned Western Conference Player of the Week honors for games played from Monday, November 13 through Sunday, November 19. On December 14, 2017 against the Sacramento Kings, Towns had 30 points, 14 rebounds, five assists and five blocks, joining Kevin Garnett as the only Wolves players to collect 30+ points, 10+ rebounds, 5+ assists and 5+ blocks in a single game. On December 31, 2017, he had 18 points, 14 rebounds and a career high-tying six blocks in a 107–90 win over the Indiana Pacers. On January 5, 2018, he recorded 25 points and a then career-high 23 rebounds in a 91–84 loss to the Boston Celtics. On January 23, 2018, Towns was named a Western Conference All-Star reserve. On March 20, 2018, he recorded his NBA-best 60th double-double with 30 points and 10 rebounds in a 123–109 win over the Los Angeles Clippers. On March 28, 2018, he scored a franchise-record 56 points and added 15 rebounds for his league-leading 63rd double-double, as the Timberwolves beat the Atlanta Hawks 126–114. The 56 points surpassed Mo Williams' franchise record of 52 points set on January 13, 2015, against the Indiana Pacers. He also became the youngest player (22 years, 133 days) with 50 points and 15 rebounds in a game since Shaquille O'Neal (22 years, 45 days) on April 20, 1994 against the Timberwolves. In the Timberwolves' regular season finale on April 11, 2018, Towns had 26 points and 14 rebounds in a 112–106 overtime win over the Denver Nuggets. The win clinched Minnesota a spot in the playoffs for the first time since 2004—no team in the league had gone longer without a postseason appearance than the Timberwolves. It was the first final-day play-in game in the NBA in 21 years, with Denver also vying for a spot in the playoffs. Towns finished the season with 68 double-doubles, the most in the NBA. In Game 3 of the Timberwolves' first-round playoff series against the Houston Rockets, Towns recorded 18 points and 16 rebounds in a 121–105 win. The Timberwolves went on to lose the series in five games, despite Towns recording 23 points and 14 rebounds in a 122–104 loss in Game 5.

Franchise player (2018–2019) 

On September 23, 2018, Towns signed a five-year, $190 million super-maximum extension with the Timberwolves. On November 9, he had a season-high 39 points and 19 rebounds in a 121–110 loss to the Sacramento Kings. On November 12, he had 25 points and a then season-high 21 rebounds in a 120–113 win over the Brooklyn Nets. On December 5, Towns recorded 35 points, 12 rebounds and tied a career high with six blocks in a 121–104 win over the Charlotte Hornets. On January 12, 2019, he recorded 27 points and a career-high 27 rebounds in a 110–106 win over the New Orleans Pelicans. On January 30, he scored all 16 of his points after halftime, including a buzzer-beating desperation shot in overtime to lift the Timberwolves over the Memphis Grizzlies 99–97. Towns missed the first game of his career on February 22 against the New York Knicks after being placed in the concussion protocol following a car accident in Minnesota. He had registered 303 consecutive starts, the longest to begin a career since 1970–71. The concussion protocol forced him to miss a second game, with his return on February 25 seeing him record 34 points and 21 rebounds in a 112–105 win over the Kings. On March 5, Towns had 41 points and 14 rebounds in a 131–120 win over the Oklahoma City Thunder, thus moving into fifth place on Minnesota's career scoring list, passing Wally Szczerbiak (6,777 points). Towns finished the season with the highest rebounding average of his career to date, at 12.4 rebounds per game.

Injuries and health problems (2019–2021) 
On October 23, 2019, in the first game of Minnesota’s season, Towns scored 36 points, grabbed 14 rebounds, blocked 3 shots, and recorded 3 steals in a 127–126 win over the Brooklyn Nets.  On October 31, Towns was suspended for two games without pay due to an altercation with Joel Embiid during a game against the Philadelphia 76ers. Towns finished the season with the highest scoring average of his career to date, at 26.5 points per game.

On 27 December 2020, Towns joined Hall-of-Famers Kareem Abdul-Jabbar, Tim Duncan, Elgin Baylor and David Robinson as the only players in NBA history to accumulate over 8,000 points, 4,000 rebounds and 1,000 assists in 360 games or less. In mid-January 2021, Towns contracted COVID-19 and missed 13 games. He returned to the court on February 10, recording 18 points and ten rebounds in a loss to the Los Angeles Clippers. On February 23, Towns had a career-high 11 assists along with 26 points and 8 rebounds in a 139–112 loss against the Milwaukee Bucks. On March 17, Towns scored a season-high 41 points, along with 10 rebounds and 8 assists in a 123–119 victory over the Phoenix Suns. In the same game his teammate Anthony Edwards scored a career-high 42 points and it was just the second time in Minnesota's franchise history that two players scored 40 points in the same game.

Three-Point contest champion (2021–2022) 
On January 9, 2022, Towns scored a then season-high 40 points, along with nine rebounds and seven assists, in a 141–123 victory over the Houston Rockets. On February 3, Towns was named a reserve for the 2022 NBA All-Star Game. On February 19, Towns won the Mountain Dew NBA Three-Point contest in Cleveland, defeating Luke Kennard and Trae Young in the final round; in doing so, he became the first center to win the contest. On March 5, a 138–101 win over the Oklahoma City Thunder, Towns recorded 36 points, 15 rebounds, five assists, three blocks, and zero turnovers. he became the first player in NBA history to record such a stat line while shooting at least 75 percent from the field in the same game, joined Tim Duncan as the only players to record these numbers in a game since 1980 (the start of the three-point era), with the exception of turnovers. On March 7, Towns was named Western Conference player of the week after leading Minnesota to a perfect 4–0 record. On March 14, Towns recorded a career-high and Timberwolves franchise-record 60 points, 32 of which in the third quarter and grabbed 17 rebounds in a 149–139 win over the San Antonio Spurs. He was also efficient in doing so, shooting 19-of-31 from the field, including 7-of-11 from beyond the arc. Towns became the first player in franchise history with multiple 50-plus point, 10-plus rebound games. He also joined Shaquille O’Neal and Wilt Chamberlain as the only centers in NBA history to have a 60-point, 15-rebound outing. Towns entered the fourth quarter with 56 points and 14 boards to join Carmelo Anthony as the only two players in the last 20 seasons with 50 or more points and 10 or more rebounds through three quarters.

On April 16, in Game 1 of the first round of the playoffs, Towns logged 29 points and 13 rebounds in a 130–117 win over the Memphis Grizzlies. On April 23, Towns recorded a career playoff-best 33 points and 14 rebounds in a 119–118 Game 4 win. Minnesota would go on to lose to Memphis in six games.

Dealing with injuries (2022–present) 
On November 28, 2022, during Minnesota's 142–127 loss to the Washington Wizards, Towns exited in the third quarter with a non-contact calf injury. The next day, the Timberwolves announced that he would be sidelined indefinitely with a right calf strain. Although sources reported the injury as a Grade 2 strain and stated that Towns would miss around four-to-six weeks of action, he later stated in January 2023 that he had suffered a Grade 3 strain, which take around two months to heal.

National team

He has represented the Dominican Republic internationally since 2012. He debuted for his country at the 2012 Centrobasket, when he was age 16.

Personal life
In April 2020, Towns' mother died from complications of COVID-19. Towns has stated that 6 other family members have died after contracting COVID-19.  In July 2020, he began dating Jordyn Woods. For the one-year anniversary of Towns' mother's death, Woods commissioned her brother, John Woods, Jr., to create a portrait of Towns' mother which was gifted to him.

Career statistics

NBA

Regular season

|-
| align="left" | 
| align="left" | Minnesota
| 82 || 82 || 32.0 || .542 || .341 || .811 || 10.5 || 2.0 || .7 || 1.7 || 18.3
|-
| align="left" | 
| align="left" | Minnesota
| 82 || 82 || 37.0 || .542 || .367 || .832 || 12.3 || 2.7 || .7 || 1.3 || 25.1
|-
| align="left" | 
| align="left" | Minnesota
| 82 || 82 || 35.6 || .545 || .421 || .858 || 12.3 || 2.4 || .8 || 1.4 || 21.3
|-
| align="left" | 
| align="left" | Minnesota
| 77 || 77 || 33.1 || .518 || .400 || .836 || 12.4 || 3.4 || .9 || 1.6 || 24.4
|-
| align="left" | 
| align="left" | Minnesota
| 35 || 35 || 33.9 || .508 || .412 || .796 || 10.8 || 4.4 || .9 || 1.2 || 26.5
|-
| align="left" | 
| align="left" | Minnesota
| 50 || 50 || 33.8 || .486 || .387 || .859 || 10.6 || 4.5 || .8 || 1.1 || 24.8
|-
| align="left" | 
| align="left" | Minnesota
| 74 || 74 || 33.5 || .529 || .410 || .822 || 9.8 || 3.6 || 1.0 || 1.1 || 24.6
|- class="sortbottom"
| align="center" colspan="2" | Career
| 482 || 482 || 34.2 || .527 || .397 || .833 || 11.3 || 3.1 || .8 || 1.4 || 23.2
|- class="sortbottom"
| align="center" colspan="2" | All-Star
| 3 || 0 || 14.7 || .615 || .273 || 1.000 || 6.3 || 1.3 || .3 || .0 || 12.3

Playoffs

|-
| style="text-align:left;"| 2018
| style="text-align:left;"| Minnesota
| 5 || 5 || 33.9 || .467 || .273 || .739 || 13.4 || 2.2 || .4 || 1.0 || 15.2
|-
| style="text-align:left;"| 2022
| style="text-align:left;"| Minnesota
| 6 || 6 || 36.9 || .488 || .455 || .860 || 10.8 || 2.2 || .7 || 2.0 || 21.8
|- class="sortbottom"
| style="text-align:center;" colspan="2"| Career
| 11 || 11 || 35.6 || .479 || .394 || .822 || 12.0 || 2.2 || .5 || 1.5 || 18.8

College

|-
| style="text-align:left;"| 2014–15
| style="text-align:left;"| Kentucky
| 39 || 39 || 21.1 || .566 || .250 || .813 || 6.7 || 1.1 || .5 || 2.3 || 10.3
|-

See also

 List of National Basketball Association single-game scoring leaders
 List of people from the Dominican Republic

References

External links

 

 Kentucky Wildcats bio
 FIBA profile

1995 births
Living people
African-American basketball players
All-American college men's basketball players
American men's basketball players
American sportspeople of Dominican Republic descent
Basketball players from New Jersey
Centers (basketball)
Dominican Republic men's basketball players
Kentucky Wildcats men's basketball players
McDonald's High School All-Americans
Minnesota Timberwolves draft picks
Minnesota Timberwolves players
National Basketball Association All-Stars
National Basketball Association players from the Dominican Republic
Parade High School All-Americans (boys' basketball)
People from Edison, New Jersey
People from Piscataway, New Jersey
Power forwards (basketball)
Sportspeople from Middlesex County, New Jersey
St. Joseph High School (Metuchen, New Jersey) alumni
21st-century African-American sportspeople